Conus santinii is a species of sea snail, a marine gastropod mollusc in the family Conidae, the cone snails, cone shells or cones.

These snails are predatory and venomous. They are capable of "stinging" humans.

Description
The size of the shell varies between 21 mm and 30 mm.

Distribution
This marine species occurs in the Pacific Ocean and is endemic to Fiji.

References

 E. Monnier & L. Limpalaër, Phasmoconus (Fulgiconus) santinii (Gastropoda, Conidae), a new surprising species from the Fiji, Xenophora Taxonomy N° 3 - Supplément au Xenophora n° 146 - April 2014
 Puillandre N., Duda T.F., Meyer C., Olivera B.M. & Bouchet P. (2015). One, four or 100 genera? A new classification of the cone snails. Journal of Molluscan Studies. 81: 1-23

External links
 To World Register of Marine Species
 

santinii
Gastropods described in 2014